The Mount Cameroon spurfowl (Pternistis camerunensis) is a bird species in the pheasant family Phasianidae. It is found only in Cameroon.

Its natural habitat is subtropical or tropical moist montane forests. It is threatened by habitat loss.

Taxonomy
The Mount Cameroon spurfowl was described in 1909 by the British Army Officer Boyd Alexander from a specimen collected on Mount Cameroon. He coined the binomial name Francolinus camerunensis.<ref>{{ cite journal | last=Alexander | first=Boyd | author-link=Boyd Alexander | year=1909 | title='Francolinus camerunensis sp. n. | journal=Bulletin of the British Ornithologists' Club | volume=25 | page=25 | url=https://biodiversitylibrary.org/page/38916125 }}</ref> The species is now placed in the genus Pternistis'' that was introduced by the German naturalist Johann Georg Wagler in 1832. The species is considered to be monotypic: no subspecies are recognised.

References

External links
BirdLife Species Factsheet.
Xeno-canto: audio recordings of the Mount Cameroon spurfowl

Pternistis
Endemic birds of Cameroon
Birds described in 1909
Taxonomy articles created by Polbot